U, Me Aur Ghar is India's first web-based feature film, launched by Web Talkies- a digital home entertainment brand.

Plot 
The film revolves around a live-in couple, Chitti and Mittu, who begin their journey by looking to buy a house in Mumbai. Along the way, they realize that a house hunt is more than just timely EMIs and romantic ideals. The film is available for viewing on YouTube, Hungama, and Web Talkies. 
The web movie, which will release on 10 February, features actors Omkar Kapoor of Pyaar Ka Punchnama 2 fame, who is seen playing the role of Mittu aka Mithilesh, and Simran Kaur Mundi from the film Kis Kisko Pyaar Karoon, with her character known as Chitti aka Chitranshi Mazumdar.

The 90-minutes web movie revisits the theme of a couple searching for their abode in a bustling city.

The web-based movie is the first step towards bringing a massive change in entertainment consumption patterns of the entire country. It shows how modern-day dynamics that affect a couple's relationship and how the house represents a physical manifestation of their love for each other.

Cast 
 Omkar Kapoor as Mittu aka Mithilesh Chaturvedi
 Simran Kaur Mundi as Chitti aka Chitranshi Mazumdar
Sanyukta Timsina as Akansha

References 

Web Talkies launches India’s first web-based feature film 'U Me Aur Ghar'
"First web-based feature film to release on Feb 10"
U Me Aur Ghar: India’s first web-based feature film by Web Talkies talks about quirky, modern-day romance brewing in the city of Mumbai
U ME AUR GHAR is India's first web-based feature film 
U ME AUR GHAR is India's first web-based feature film : Trade News
U Me Aur Ghar: India’s first web-based feature film by Web Talkies
U Me Aur Ghar: India’s first web-based feature film by Web Talkies talks about quirky, modern-day romance brewing in the city of Mumbai 
U Me Aur Ghar: India’s first web-based feature film by Web Talkies 
वेब आधारित फिल्म होगी ‘यू मी और घर’

External links

2017 films
2010s Hindi-language films
Indian direct-to-video films
2017 direct-to-video films